The Russian orthography has been reformed officially and unofficially by changing the Russian alphabet over the course of the history of the Russian language. Several important reforms happened in the 18th–20th centuries.

Early changes 
Old East Slavic adopted the Cyrillic script, approximately during the 10th century and at about the same time as the introduction of Eastern Christianity into the territories inhabited by the Eastern Slavs. No distinction was drawn between the vernacular language and the liturgical, though the latter was based on South Slavic rather than Eastern Slavic norms.  As the language evolved, several letters, notably the yuses (Ѫ, Ѭ, Ѧ, Ѩ) were gradually and unsystematically discarded from both secular and church usage over the next centuries.

The emergence of the centralized Russian state in the 15th and 16th centuries, the consequent rise of the state bureaucracy along with the development of the common economic, political and cultural space necessitated the standardization of the language used in administrative and legal affairs.  It was due to that reason that the earliest attempts at standardizing Russian, both in terms of the vocabulary and in terms of the orthography were made, initially based on the so-called Moscow chancery language.  From then and on the underlying logic of language reforms in Russia reflected primarily the considerations of standardizing and streamlining language norms and rules in order to ensure the language's role as a practical tool of communication and administration.

18th-century changes 

The printed Russian alphabet began to assume its modern shape when Peter I introduced his "civil script" type reform in 1708. The reform was not specifically orthographic in nature. With the strength of the historic tradition diminishing, Russian spelling in the 18th century became rather inconsistent, both in practice and in theory, as Mikhail Lomonosov advocated a morphophonemic orthography and Vasily Trediakovsky a phonemic one.

19th-century changes 

Throughout the 18th and 19th centuries, miscellaneous adjustments were made ad hoc, as the Russian literary language came to assume its modern and highly standardized form. (The standard Russian language neither has nor ever had a voiceless dental fricative. The  was used only for foreign words, particularly Greek.)

The  remained more common, though it became quite rare as a "Western" (French-like) pronunciation had been adopted for many words; for example,  ('theater') became .

Attempts to reduce spelling inconsistency culminated in the standard textbook of Grot (1885), which retained its authority through 21 editions until the Russian Revolution of 1917. His fusion of the morphological, phonetic, and historic principles of Russian orthography remains valid to this day, though both the Russian alphabet and the writing of many individual words have been altered through a complicated but extremely consistent system of spelling rules that tell which of two vowels to use under all conditions.

Post-revolution reform 
The most recent major reform of Russian spelling was prepared by Aleksey Shakhmatov and implemented shortly after the Bolshevik revolution of November 1917.

Shakhmatov headed the Assembly for Considering Simplification of the Orthography whose proposals of 11 May 1917 formed the basis of the new rules soon adopted by the Ministry of Popular Education.

Specific changes 

For instance,  became  ("Rybinsk").

Examples:
 Сѣверо-Американскіе Соединенные Штаты to Северо-Американские Соединённые Штаты – The United States of America (popular pre-revolutionary name of the United States in Russia)
 Россія to Россия
 Петроградъ to Петроград (Petrograd) 
 раіонъ to район (region/district) 
 мараѳонъ to марафон (marathon) 
 дѣти to дети (children) 
 Іисусъ Христосъ to Иисус Христос (Jesus Christ)

Practical implementation 
 
In December 1917, the People's Commissariat of Education, headed by A. V. Lunacharsky, issued a decree stating, "All state and government institutions and schools without exception should carry out the transition to the new orthography without delay. From 1 January 1918, all government and state publications, both periodical and non-periodical were to be printed in the new style." The decree was nearly identical to the proposals put forth by the May Assembly, and with other minor modifications formed the substance of the decree issued by the Soviet of People's Commissars in October 1918.

Although occasionally praised by the Russian working class, the reform was unpopular amongst the educated people, religious leaders and many prominent writers, many of whom were oppositional to the new state. Furthermore, even the workers ridiculed the spelling reform at first, arguing it made the Russian language poorer and less elegant.

In this way, private publications could formally be printed using the old (or more generally, any convenient) orthography. The decree forbade the retraining of people previously trained under the old norm. A given spelling was considered a misspelling only if it violated both the old and the new norms.

However, in practice, the Soviet government rapidly set up a monopoly on print production and kept a very close eye on the fulfillment of the edict. People resisting the implementation of the new orthography were deemed enemies of the people and executed. Nonetheless, some academic printings (connected with the publication of old works, documents or printings whose typesettings predated the revolution) came out in the old orthography (except title pages and, often, prefaces) up until 1929.

Russian – and later Soviet – railroads operated locomotives with designations of "", "" and "".  Despite the reformed orthography, the series names remained unchanged up until these locomotives were discontinued in the 1950s.

Some Russian émigré publications continued to appear in the former orthography until the 1970s.

Simplification of the language 
The reform reduced the number of orthographic rules having no support in pronunciation—for example, the difference of the genders in the plural and the need to learn a long list of words which were written with "yat"s (the composition of said list was controversial among linguists, and different spelling guides contradicted one another).

Criticism 

According to critics, the choice of Ии as the only letter to represent that side and the removal of Іі defeated the purpose of 'simplifying’ the language, as Ии occupies more space and, furthermore, is sometimes indistinguishable from Шш.

The reform also created many homographs and homonyms, which used to be spelled differently. Examples: есть/ѣсть (to be/eat) and миръ/міръ (peace/the World) became есть and мир in both instances.

In a complex system of cases, -аго was replaced with -его (лучшаго → лучшего), in other instances -аго was replaced with -ого, -яго with -его (e.g., новаго → нового, ранняго → раннего), feminine cases moved from -ыя, -ія — to -ые, -ие (новыя (книги, изданія) → новые);
Feminine pronouns онѣ, однѣ, однѣхъ, однѣмъ, однѣми were replaced with они, одни, одних, одним, одними; ея (нея) was replaced with на её (неё).

The latter was especially controversial, as these feminine pronouns had been deep-rooted in the language and extensively used by writers and poets.

Prefixes  з/с underwent a change: now all of them (except с-) ended with с before voiceless consonants and with з before voiced consonants or vowels (разбить, разораться, разступиться → разбить, разораться, but расступиться), which was also the opposite of "simplification", as children needed to learn where to write з and с.

More recent modifications 
While there have not been any significant changes since the 1918 decree, debates and fluctuations have to some degree continued.

In December 1942, the use of letter Ё was made mandatory by Decree No. 1825 of the People's Commissariat of Education.

A codification of the rules of Russian orthography and punctuation was published in 1956 but only a few minor orthographic changes were introduced at that time. The 1956 codification additionally included a clarification of new rules for punctuation developed during the 1930s, and which had not been mentioned in the 1918 decree.

A notable instance of renewed debate followed A.I. Efimov's 1962 publication of an article in Izvestia. The article proposed extensive reform to move closer to a phonetic representation of the language. Following the renewed discussion in papers and journals a new Orthographic Commission began work in 1962, under the Russian Language Institute of the Academy of Sciences of the USSR. The Commission published its report,  (Proposal for the Improvement of Russian Orthography), in 1964. The publication resulted in widespread debate in newspapers, journals, and on radio and television, as well as over 10,000 letters, all of which were passed to the institute.

Responses to the article pointed to the need to simplify Russian spelling due to the use of Russian as the language of international communication in the Soviet Union and an increased study of Russian in the Eastern Bloc as well as in the West. That instruction for non-native speakers of Russian was one of the central concerns of further reform is indicated in the resistance to Efimov's proposal to drop the terminal "ь" (soft sign) from feminine nouns, as it helps learners identify gender category. Additionally, Efimov claimed that a disproportionate amount of primary school class time was devoted to orthography, rather than phonetics and morphology. Efimov asserted that the existing orthography was essentially unchanged since Grot's codification, and that only by bringing orthography closer to phonetic realization, and eliminating exceptions and variants, could appropriate attention be paid to stylistics and the "development of speech culture". The state's focus on proper instruction in Russian, as the national language of ethnic Russians, as the state language, and as the language of international communication continues to the present day.

Encoding
The IETF language tags have registered:
 for text from the Peter reforms of 1708 until the 1917–18 reforms.
 for text following the 1917–18 reforms.

See also
 Yoficator

References and notes

External links
 Criticism of 1917 reform 
 CyrAcademisator Bi-directional online transliteration for ALA-LC (diacritics), scientific, ISO/R 9, ISO 9, GOST 7.79B and others. Supports pre-reform characters
The Writing on the Wall: The Russian Orthographic Reform of 1917

History of the Russian language
Russian
Russian orthography